The Aero Bravo Patriot is an ultralight aircraft from the Brazilian manufacturer Aerobravo Indústria Aeronáutica Ltda.

Design and development
The Patriot is a two-seat strutted shoulder-wing aircraft and consists of a frame of aluminum tubes planked with aluminum. The cockpit cell is made of composite materials and can be entered through side doors. The aircraft has a conventional tail unit and a non-retractable nose wheel landing gear. It is powered by either a 60 kW Rotax 912 UL, 74 kW Rotax 912 ULS, 85 kW Rotax 914 Turbo, 74 kW Continental O-200, or a 92 kW Continental IO-240.

Specifications

References

Bibliography

External links
Photo on flickr.com

2000s Brazilian ultralight aircraft
ultralight aircraft
Single-engined tractor aircraft